The Czech Basketball Cup is the annual top-tier level national basketball cup competition that is held in the Czech Republic, for professional teams. It is organized by the Czech Basketball Federation (Česká Basketbalová Federace), the governing body of basketball in the Czech Republic. The first edition of the competition was played in 1994. ČEZ Nymburk is the all-time record holder, with 14 titles. The competition concludes with a Final Four each season, including a third-place game.

Title holders 

 1993–94 JIP Pardubice
 1994–95 Tonak Nový Jičín
 1995–96 Tonak Nový Jičín
 1996–97 Opava
 1997–98 Opava
 1998–99 Opava
 1999–00 Mlékárna Kunín
 2000–01 Opava
 2001–02 Mlékárna Kunín
 2002–03 Opava
 2003–04 ČEZ Nymburk
 2004–05 ČEZ Nymburk
 2005–06 Mlékárna Kunín
 2006–07 ČEZ Nymburk
 2007–08 ČEZ Nymburk
 2008–09 ČEZ Nymburk
 2009–10 ČEZ Nymburk
 2010–11 ČEZ Nymburk
 2011–12 ČEZ Nymburk
 2012–13 ČEZ Nymburk
 2013–14 ČEZ Nymburk
 2014–15 Prostějov
 2015–16 JIP Pardubice
 2016–17 ČEZ Nymburk
 2017–18 ČEZ Nymburk
 2018–19 ČEZ Nymburk
 2019–20 ČEZ Nymburk
 2020–21 ČEZ Nymburk
 2021–22 Opava

Performance by club

Final Fours

See also
Czech National Basketball League

References

External links
Czech Republic Cup at Flashscore

Cup
Basketball cup competitions in Europe
1994 establishments in the Czech Republic